Christine A. Orme is an American physicist who studies the growth and decay of materials at surfaces, especially focusing on biomineralization. She is a Senior Staff Scientist at the Lawrence Livermore National Laboratory, working in the  	
BioNanomaterials Group of the Physical and Life Sciences Directorate.

Education and career
Orme majored in physics at the University of California, Berkeley, graduating in 1986. She completed her Ph.D. in 1995 at the University of Michigan, working there with Bradford Orr.

After completing her Ph.D. she became a postdoctoral researcher at the Lawrence Livermore National Laboratory, and continued there as a staff researcher.

Recognition
Pantoya was a 2004 winner of the Presidential Early Career Award for Scientists and Engineers. She was elected as a Fellow of the American Physical Society (APS) in 2009, after a nomination from the APS Division of Materials Physics, "for her outstanding contributions in understanding the fundamental physics of crystallization and materials assembly with application to biomineralizaion, biomimetic synthesis, and shape control of nanostructures". In 2010 she was given the Department of Energy Outstanding Mentor Award.

References

Year of birth missing (living people)
Living people
American physicists
American women physicists
University of California, Berkeley alumni
University of Michigan alumni
Lawrence Livermore National Laboratory staff
Fellows of the American Physical Society